Colin Morgan (born 1 January 1986) is a Northern Irish actor. He is best known for playing the title character in the BBC fantasy series Merlin (2008–2012), Leo Elster in Humans (2015–2018), and Billy Clanton in Kenneth Branagh’s Belfast (2021).

Morgan made his London theatre debut in 2007 as the title character in DBC Pierre's Vernon God Little. He went on to appear in the theatre productions Pedro Almodóvar's Todo sobre mi madre ("All About My Mother") in 2007, Thomas Babe's A Prayer for My Daughter in 2008, Pedro Miguel Rozo's Our Private Life in 2011, Step in Time at The Old Vic 24 Hour Musicals Celebrity Gala in 2012, Shakespeare's The Tempest in 2013, and Jez Butterworth's Mojo during 2013 and 2014.

In July 2008, Screen International named Morgan as a "Star of Tomorrow". For his performance in Merlin, Morgan was nominated for Outstanding Actor (Drama) in the Monte Carlo TV Festival Awards in 2009, 2010, and 2011, and Best Actor in Drama Performance: Male in the National Television Awards in 2013.

Early life and education
Morgan was born in Armagh, Northern Ireland, the son of Bernard, a painter and decorator, and Bernadette, a nurse. He is the younger of two brothers; they were both raised Roman Catholic.

In 1997, Morgan began studies at Integrated College Dungannon.  Morgan starred in several college productions including Surgical Sensations at St. Senapods and Bad Day at Black Frog Creek.

Morgan was awarded a National Diploma in Performing Arts from the Belfast Institute of Further and Higher Education in 2004. He graduated from the Royal Conservatoire of Scotland in 2007. In the final year of his undergraduate course, he was discovered by theatre director Rufus Norris and made the decision to leave three-quarters of the way through to make his professional London West End theatre debut as the title character in Vernon God Little. Morgan's performance was well received and used as an assessment for his final grade.

In November 2010, the Belfast Metropolitan College honoured Morgan with an Award of Distinction for his contribution to the Arts.

Career

Theatre
Morgan made his professional stage debut in London as the titular character Vernon God Little mounted at the Young Vic in 2007. The Telegraph said that Morgan "captures all the vulnerability, confusion and gallows humour of the adolescent hero who finds himself in no end of trouble." That same year, Morgan went on to play the role of Esteban, an aspiring teenage writer, in the Old Vic stage adaptation of Pedro Almodóvar's Todo sobre mi madre (All About My Mother) opposite Diana Rigg. For both of these roles, Morgan was nominated for the 2007 London Newcomer of the Year in the Whatsonstage.com Theatregoers' Choice Awards.

In 2008, Morgan appeared in the Young Vic production of Thomas Babe's A Prayer for My Daughter. The Independent noted Morgan brought Jimmy to life through "twisting, twitching mood-swings and mix of half-druggy cackling punk and half-angelic visionary." Variety also singled out his "remarkable level of twitchy intensity."

In 2011, Morgan performed in the Royal Court Theatre production of Pedro Miguel Rozo's play Our Private Life to favourable reviews as Carlos, a "bipolar compulsive fantasist" homosexual who suspects he was molested by his father as a child. On 9 December 2012, Morgan performed the role of Gary, a flamboyant dance instructor trying to win the heart of one of his students, in Step in Time at The Old Vic 24 Hour Musicals Celebrity Gala in aid of The Old Vic Trust.

He played Ariel opposite Roger Allam's Prospero in the 2013 Globe Theatre production of The Tempest, which was later broadcast to cinemas as part of Globe On Screen in May 2014, with a subsequent DVD release in July 2014. For this role, Morgan sought to imbue his portrayal of Ariel with "ethereal stillness" and "acrobatic precision". The Washington Post critic said that he "can't remember a better Ariel," and that Morgan's portrayal was "mysterious, in a way I've never quite experienced before — also wonderfully vulnerable".

From 2013 to 2014, Morgan made his West End debut as Skinny Luke in Jez Butterworth's dark comedy Mojo at the Harold Pinter Theatre. Radio Times described Morgan's performance as "an accomplished study in human weakness ... played with precision and pathos."

In 2017, Morgan returned to London theatre, appearing in Branden Jacobs-Jenkins' Gloria, a comic drama.

Morgan made his National Theatre debut in May 2018, starring in the new production of Brian Friel's Translations, directed by Ian Rickson.

He performed at the Bridge Theatre in early 2020, for Caryl Churchill's A Number opposite Roger Allam.

Television

2007–08: Early years
In television, Morgan first appeared in 2007 as the embarrassed gay son John Leary in sketches on The Catherine Tate Show'''s "Christmas Special." In 2008, he portrayed the conflicted teenager Jethro Cane opposite David Tennant in the fan-favourite Doctor Who episode "Midnight."

2008–2012: Merlin

Morgan is best known for playing the title role in BBC TV series Merlin from 2008 to 2012 Merlin chronicles the adventures of a young warlock who serves as Arthur's servant and Gaius' ward; Merlin must secretly develop his magical gifts under the gaze of Kings Uther and Arthur, both of whom despise the art.

The show was loosely based on the Arthurian legends of Merlin and his relationship with King Arthur. Morgan was nominated for and won multiple acting awards, including the Caron Keating Outstanding Newcomer Award in the 56th annual Variety Club Showbiz Award ceremony on 16 November 2008 (at the start of the series) and the Best Actor in Drama Performance: Male award in the 2013 National Television Awards (at the conclusion of the series).

The role of Merlin proved difficult to cast, according to co-creator and executive producer Johnny Capps. "We had to find an actor who has a broad playing range, someone with the lightness of touch who will be able to deal with action and magic", Capps said in a 2011 interview. "We had an instinct about Colin. At first we weren't sure about him but then saw him again and again and we watched back his final auditions and said, 'He's perfect for the part.'" Before auditioning for the role, Morgan received the script for Prince Arthur by mistake.  He only had five minutes before his audition to read over the correct part.

2014–present
After spending 2013 in back-to-back stage productions, Morgan reappeared on television as an ambitious journalist in an episode of the 1950s Irish crime drama Quirke, based on the books by John Banville.

Later that year, he took on the role of detective sergeant alongside Gillian Anderson and Jamie Dornan in the second series of The Fall. Morgan was approached to play the role, meeting with writer Allan Cubitt and lead actress Gillian Anderson in London to discuss his involvement.  To prepare for his performance, Morgan read up on police procedures and spoke to the set's police advisor.  He also did an impromptu interview of two police officers he saw in the street in London.

In June 2015, Morgan began his role as the mysterious fugitive Leo Elster in Humans, a British-American AMC/Channel 4 eight-part science fiction drama adapted from the Swedish series Real Humans.  Humans was Channel 4's highest-rated drama since The Camomile Lawn (1992). Reviewer Paul Simpson described Morgan as one who "always rises to strong material, and [whose] performance has become increasingly engaging as the series has progressed."

In the summer of 2016, Morgan starred with actress Charlotte Spencer in the BBC One Victorian era ghost hunter series The Living and the Dead as the central character Nathan Appleby.

Later that year, he reprised his roles in The Fall's Series 3, and in Series 2 of Humans.

Film
Morgan portrayed a homeless drug-addict opposite Colm Meaney in the 2010 independent Irish film Parked, for which he spent several weeks in Dublin researching drug addiction and homelessness. Morgan's performance was praised by multiple critics and director Darragh Byrne.

In 2011, Morgan appeared in the film Island, an independent adaptation of Jane Rogers' novel Island.

Morgan next portrayed WWI British soldier Victor Richardson, in a BBC Films and Heyday Films feature adaptation of Vera Brittain's World War I memoir Testament of Youth. To prepare for the role of the soldier, Morgan read Brittain's works, as well as personal letters exchanged between Vera, Victor, and their friends. He also contacted a Blind Veterans Charity in Brighton, which allowed him to interview blind people. The British Film Institute's brochure said, "Shining brightly and lingering long in the mind afterwards, are the performances of three rising British stars – Colin Morgan, Taron Egerton and Kit Harington”.

In the autumn of 2015, Morgan was featured as Frankie Shea, brother-in-law and personal driver of Tom Hardy's Reggie Kray, in the 1960s London gangster film Legend based on the book The Profession of Violence: The Rise and Fall of the Kray Twins by John Pearson.

For two days in Blackpool, from 9 to 10 May 2015, Morgan filmed The Laughing King, a short film by White No Sugar TV and Funky Films in support of the UK charity Campaign Against Living Miserably's (CALM) push to raise awareness regarding depression, mental illness and male suicide. He played the role of Jake, a young man who arrives in Blackpool, the seaside town of his childhood, determined to end his life. It was released on 12 January 2016, in the London Short Film Festival.

Morgan filmed Waiting for You from May to June 2015, co-starring with French actress Fanny Ardant.

In April 2016, Morgan portrayed the Duke of Blackwood in the Snow White and the Huntsman spin-off, The Huntsman: Winter's War.

In the fall of 2016, Morgan filmed the Oscar Wilde biopic The Happy Prince alongside Rupert Everett and Colin Firth, in Bavaria, Germany.

In the summer of 2017, Morgan played the title role in Benjamin, a film written and directed by Simon Amstell.

In 2021, Morgan appeared in Kenneth Branagh’s  film Belfast , based on the director’s childhood during The Troubles. The film was nominated for the Academy Award for Best Picture.

Radio
Morgan took part in BBC Radio play Cry Babies by Kim Newman on BBC Radio 4 in March 2009, playing the part of Roger. In December 2014, he starred as Newton Pulsifer in the first audio dramatisation of the popular book Good Omens, written by Neil Gaiman and Terry Pratchett, directed and adapted by Dirk Maggs, and produced by Heather Larmour, also on BBC Radio 4.

On 4 December 2016, Morgan read Autumn Journal on BBC Radio 3, which was about Louis MacNeice's poetic testament of life in 1938, written against the turbulent backdrop of the Munich Agreement, the fall of Barcelona and Britain's preparations for an inevitable war.

Narration
For the 100th anniversary of the Titanic's sinking on 14 April 2012, Morgan performed readings from survivor accounts and testimonials during Titanic: A Commemoration in Music and Film, broadcast live on BBC2 from Belfast's Waterfront Hall.

On 27 August 2014, Morgan narrated Big Mountain Productions' Addicts Symphony on Channel 4. The one-off documentary followed composer, musician and recovering alcoholic James McConnel as he brought together ten classical musicians whose lives had been blighted by addiction for a spectacular concert.

Video games
Morgan voiced Merlin's game sequences in 2012's Merlin: The Game.

Personal life

Morgan is a vegetarian, citing allergies and lactose intolerance. He has advocated ethical consumerism and practises yoga.

Morgan does not participate in social media, saying: "There's no social media or googling yourself. You only have to do it once to learn never to do it again."

Morgan has also criticised celebrity culture:Something has been lost somewhere along the way with the craft of story-telling ... When the creativity is overshadowed by the 'business' I often feel disappointed by that. We have some amazing filmmakers who are keeping the spirit of the craft alive and that's a hub of excitement I want to be in.

Charity and social action
From October 2009 until its conclusion in March 2011, Morgan was an ambassador for the A Night Less Ordinary scheme in which Arts Council England offered free theatre tickets to anyone under 26 years old. He contributed a painting from the Merlin: Colin and Bradley Quest series to the 2010 BBC Children in Need auction. It sold for £620.00.

On 9 April 2011, Morgan collected funds for the Great Ormond Street Hospital. On 9 December 2012, he was a part of the 24 Hour Musicals'' at the Old Vic Theatre, which brought together more than 30 actors, directors, writers and composers to create four short musicals in just 24 hours. The process culminated in four world premieres presented to an audience of more than 1,000, and raised £182,000 towards the work that the theatre does with emerging talent, schools and the community.

Filmography

Theatre

Television

Film

Radio

Narration

Video games

Other credits

Awards and nominations

References

External links

 
 Colin Morgan at United Agents

1986 births
Living people
People from Armagh (city)
Alumni of the Royal Conservatoire of Scotland
Male stage actors from Northern Ireland
Male television actors from Northern Ireland
Male film actors from Northern Ireland
Male radio actors from Northern Ireland
Male Shakespearean actors from Northern Ireland
21st-century male actors from Northern Ireland
Merlin (2008 TV series)